SAAC may refer to:

 Comodoro Pierrestegui Airport, Argentina (ICAO code)
 Securities Analysts Association of China
 Scottish Artists and Artist Craftsmen, former name of Visual Arts Scotland
 South African Armoured Corps
 San Antonio Aviation Cadet Center, now Lackland Air Force Base, in Texas
 Swiss American Aviation Corporation, see Learjet 23